Gensel is a German surname. Notable people with the name include:

Constanze Gensel (born 1969/70), German figure skater
John Garcia Gensel (1917–1998), American Lutheran minister
Patricia G. Gensel (born 1944), American botanist and paleobotanist

German-language surnames